PCE may stand for:

Business and economics
 Personal consumption expenditure, or private consumption expenditure
 Personal consumption expenditures price index, a measure of inflation

Chemistry and engineering
 PCE or eticyclidine, an illegal drug related to Phencyclidine (PCP)
 Tetrachloroethylene (perchloroethylene), widely used in dry-cleaning
 Pro-opiomelanocortin converting enzyme, an enzyme
 Pyrometric cone equivalent, measuring heat in the firing of pottery
 Power conversion efficiency, a near synonym for "Energy conversion efficiency" often used in the field of photovoltaics

Computing
 Path computation element, a network element used for pathfinding
 Principle of computational equivalence, a concept developed by Stephen Wolfram published in the book A New Kind of Science
 PC Engine, a video game console

Medicine
 Prenatal cocaine exposure, exposure of a fetus to cocaine when a pregnant woman uses the drug
 Eticyclidine, a dissociative anesthetic drug

Organizations
 Paavai College of Engineering, Namakkal, Tamil Nadu, India
 Padmanava College of Engineering, Rourkela, an engineering college in Rourkela, Orissa state, India
 Parents for Choice in Education, an advocacy group in Utah, U.S.
 Parliamentary Commissioner for the Environment, New Zealand government agency

Political parties

Spain
 PCE, Communist Party of Spain or "Partido Comunista de España"
 PCE(i), Communist Party of Spain (International)(1975) or Partido Comunista de España(Internacional)
 PCE(m-l), Communist Party of Spain (Marxist–Leninist) or Partido Comunista de España (Marxista-Leninista)
 PCE(ML), Communist Party of Spain (Marxist–Leninist) (historical) or Partido Comunista de España (Marxista-Leninista)
 PCE(M-R), Workers' Party of Spain–Communist Unity or Partido de los Trabajadores de España–Unidad Comunista
 PCE(R), Communist Party of Spain (Reconstituted) or Partido Comunista de España (Reconstituido)

Other countries
 Parti Communautaire Européen, a political party in Belgium
 Partido Comunista del Ecuador, the Communist Party of Ecuador

Other
 ISO 639:pce or Palaung language, spoken in Burma and neighboring countries
 Passenger car equivalent, a measure of traffic flow
 PCE-842-class patrol craft, U.S. Navy patrol craft escorts, many of which were transferred to the Philippine Navy
 Power cost equalization, a state subsidy in Alaska
 Pardubice